Battle of Yarmouk Camp may refer to:

 Battle of Yarmouk Camp (2015)
 Battle of Yarmouk Camp (December 2012)